The Interreligious Foundation for Community Organization is an international religious community whose aim is to ensure justice for the oppressed peoples of the world. IFCO was founded in 1967. Through the project Pastors for Peace, IFCO works in Cuba, Mexico, Haiti, and other nations of Central America and the Caribbean.

External links
 Official Website
 Cuba-bound Aid Caravan Stops in Providence by Maria Armental, July 8, 2009
 Church Offers help to Cuban Victims by Rondrell Moore, Terre Haute Channel 10 News, July 13, 2009
 KOWA 106.5 LP FM presents an interview with the 22nd Pastors for Peace Cuba Caravanistas in Olympia, Washington on July 6, 2011.

Cuba solidarity groups
Political advocacy groups in the United States
Religious organizations established in 1967